The Prix Québec-Wallonie-Bruxelles de littérature de jeunesse is a literary award given out every two years for French language children's literature.

The award is given to writers and illustrators from Quebec and the French-speaking community of Belgium. Since 2005, one Quebec winner and one Belgian winner have been chosen. It is intended to encourage  the development of children's literature in French and also to promote trade between Québec and Belgium.

Winners

References 
 

Belgian literary awards
Canadian children's literary awards